The 1978 Swedish Open – Doubles event was part of the 1978 Swedish Open tennis tournament and was played on outdoor clay courts in Båstad, Sweden between 17 July and 23 July 1973. Mark Edmondson and John Marks were the defending Swedish Open champions but did not compete together in this edition. First-seeded team of Bob Carmichael and Mark Edmondson won the doubles title by defeating Péter Szőke and Balázs Taróczy in the final, 7–5, 6–4.

Seeds

Draw

References

External links
 ITF tournament edition details

Men's doubles
Doubles